Miners' strikes are when miners conduct strike actions.

See also
List of strikes

References 

 
Miners